The Santa Lucia Mountains slender salamander (Batrachoseps luciae) is a species of salamander in the family Plethodontidae. It is endemic to California in the United States, where it is known only from Monterey County.

This salamander is distributed in the Santa Lucia Range in California's Central Coast region. It lives in moist montane chaparral and woodlands and temperate coniferous forest, and it can tolerate disturbed habitat when adequate cover is present.

This species and several other native California salamanders were described as new species in 2001 when the Batrachoseps pacificus species complex was split according to the results of a phylogenetic analysis.

References

External links
Batrachoseps luciae. AmphibiaWeb.
Santa Lucia Mountains Slender Salamander – Batrachoseps luciae. CaliforniaHerps.
NatureServe. 2015. Batrachoseps luciae. NatureServe Explorer. Version 7.1. Accessed 19 June 2016.

Batrachoseps
Salamander
Salamander
Fauna of the California chaparral and woodlands
Natural history of the California Coast Ranges
Natural history of Monterey County, California
Monterey Ranger District, Los Padres National Forest

Amphibians described in 2001
Taxonomy articles created by Polbot